An Environmentally Sensitive Habitat Area (ESHA - pronounced ē'-sha) is a designated protective area within the Coastal Zone of California, United States, as described in the California Coastal Act and Certified Local Coastal Programs for local government.

External links
 Designation of ESHA in the Santa Monica Mountains, California Coastal Commission 

Environment of California